Saw II is a 2005 horror film directed by Darren Lynn Bousman and written by Leigh Whannell and Bousman. It is the sequel to 2004's Saw and the second installment in the Saw film series. The film stars Donnie Wahlberg, Franky G, Glenn Plummer, Beverley Mitchell, Dina Meyer, Emmanuelle Vaugier, Erik Knudsen, Shawnee Smith, and Tobin Bell. In the film, a group of ex-convicts are trapped by the Jigsaw Killer inside a house and must pass a series of deadly tests to retrieve the antidote for a nerve agent that will kill them in two hours.

After the successful opening weekend of 2004's Saw, a sequel was immediately green-lit. Whannell and James Wan were busy preparing for their next film and were unable to write or direct. Bousman wrote a script called The Desperate before Saw was released and was looking for a producer but many studios rejected it. Gregg Hoffman received the script and showed it to his partners Mark Burg and Oren Koules. It was decided that, with some changes, it could be made into Saw II. Whannell became available to provide rewrites of the script. The film was given a larger budget and was shot from May to June 2005 in Toronto.

Saw II was released in the United States on October 28, 2005, by Lionsgate Films. It opened with $31.9 million and grossed $88 million in the United States and Canada. It has remained the highest grossing Saw film in those countries. Bell was nominated for "Best Villain" at the 2006 MTV Movie Awards for his role as Jigsaw in the film. Saw II was released to home media on February 14, 2006, and topped charts its first week, selling more than 3 million units. A sequel, titled Saw III, was released in 2006.

Plot

Police informant Michael awakens in a room with a spike-filled mask locked around his neck. He refuses to retrieve the key from his eye and is killed when the mask closes on his head. At the scene of Michael's murder, Detective Kerry finds a message for her former partner, Detective Eric Matthews. Matthews joins Kerry and Officer Rigg in leading a SWAT team to the factory which produced the lock from Michael's trap. There they apprehend John Kramer, the Jigsaw Killer, who indicates computer monitors showing eight people trapped in a house, including his only known survivor Amanda, Matthews' son Daniel, and six other victims: Xavier, Jonas, Laura, Addison, Obi, and Gus. A nerve agent filling the house will kill them all within two hours, but John assures Matthews that if he follows the rules of his own game, he will see Daniel again. At Kerry's urging, Matthews agrees to buy time for the tech team to arrive and trace the video signal. During their conversation, John reveals to Matthews that his main motivation for his games was a suicide attempt after his cancer diagnosis, which led to a newfound appreciation for life; the games are intended to help his victims develop the same appreciation.

The group is informed by a microcassette recorder that antidotes are hidden throughout the house; one is in the room's safe, and the tape provides a cryptic clue. Gus ignores a warning note and uses the key provided with the cassette on the door, which triggers a gun through the peephole that kills him. Once the door opens, they search the house and find a basement, where Obi, who helped with abducting the other victims, is killed in a furnace trap while trying to retrieve two antidotes. In another room, Xavier's test involves digging through a pit filled with syringes to retrieve a key to a steel door in two minutes, but he instead throws Amanda into the pit. She retrieves the key, but Xavier fails to unlock the door in time. Throughout the game, the group discuss connections between them and determine that each has been incarcerated before except Daniel. During his father's test, John reveals their affiliation to Matthews, who was a corrupt police officer who framed his suspects in various crimes.

Xavier returns to the safe room and finds a number on the back of Gus' neck. After realizing the numbers are the combination for the safe, he kills Jonas and begins hunting the others. Laura succumbs to the nerve agent and dies, after finding the clue revealing Daniel's identity. Incensed by the revelation, Addison leaves on her own and finds a glass box containing an antidote, but her arms become trapped in the openings which are lined with hidden blades. Xavier enters the room and leaves her to die after reading her number. Amanda and Daniel find a tunnel from the first room leading to the dilapidated bathroom. After Xavier corners them, Amanda taunts him by implying that he will not learn his number because nobody will read it to him. Xavier responds by cutting off a piece of skin from the back of his neck to read his number. Xavier charges them, and Daniel slits his throat with the hacksaw.

Having seen Xavier chasing his son, Matthews assaults John and forces him to lead him to the house. The tech team tracks the video's source and while Rigg's team searches the house, Kerry realizes that the game took place days before they captured John until the timer for Matthews' game expires to reveal Daniel inside a safe, bound and breathing in an oxygen mask. Unaware of these events, Matthews enters the house alone and makes his way to the bathroom, where he is subdued by a pig-masked figure. He awakens shackled at the ankle to a pipe and finds a tape recorder left by Amanda, who reveals she had become John's accomplice after surviving her first trap and helped him set up Matthews' test during the game at the house, intending to continue John's work after he dies. Amanda then appears and seals the door, leaving Matthews to die as John hears his screams outside and smiles.

Cast

Production

Development and writing

Saw II was immediately green-lighted after Saws successful opening weekend a year earlier. Producers needed a script for a sequel  but James Wan and Leigh Whannell, director and writer of Saw, were working on Universal Pictures's Dead Silence. Music video director Darren Lynn Bousman had just completed a script for his first film The Desperate, and was trying to sell it to studios but was getting reactions that the script was very similar to Saw. A German studio eventually approached him with an offer to produce the film for $1 million. Just as they were looking for a cinematographer, the American cinematographer David A. Armstrong, who had worked on Saw, arrived on the scene and suggested showing the script to Saw producer Gregg Hoffman. Hoffman read the script and called Bousman wanting to produce The Desperate. Bousman was initially upset when he heard about his script's similarities to Saw, and feared at first that Lionsgate's call was due to complaints of plagiarism. After Hoffman showed the script to his partners Mark Burg and Oren Koules, the two decided that The Desperate was the starting script they needed for Saw II and two months later, Bousman was flown to Toronto to direct.

Whannell polished the script, with input from Wan, in order to bring it into the Saw universe, but kept the characters, traps and deaths from The Desperate script. Bousman said, "But you could read the script for The Desperate and watch Saw II, and you would not be able to draw a comparison". Bousman's first draft for The Desperate consisted in an X-rated violent film, but after Bousman's agent found difficult to have the script bought because most studios were turned off due to the level of violence, Bousman modified his script to be an R-rated film, which is when the executives of Lionsgate were turned on his potential. Overall, the framework of The Desperate had a similar bleak, disgusting atmosphere and a twist ending, which is why the executives found parallels in the script's style. Wan and Whannell also served as executive producers. All the previous film's crew members returned: editor Kevin Greutert, cinematographer Armstrong, and composer Charlie Clouser. This would be Hoffman's last film; He died unexpectedly on December 4, 2005.

Only those key cast and crew members who were involved in the film's ending were given the full script; the rest received only the first 88 pages. If a particular page was rewritten, the old page was shredded. Members were also required to sign confidentiality agreements requiring them not to release any plot details. Reportedly, "four or five" alternate endings were shot in order to keep the ending a surprise. Bousman gave the actors freedom to change dialogue in the script. He said that 95% of the time, the actors went by the script, with about 5% being adlibs, which he said "made all of the difference in the world". Donnie Wahlberg was allowed to modify some pieces of dialogue, especially those of Eric Matthews' interactions with his son Daniel and Jigsaw. For the former, Wahlberg added the line of what was the last thing Eric told Daniel basing it on what he says to his first son before hanging up the phone. For the latter, Wahlberg felt that the relationship between Eric and Jigsaw was "too dicey" and should emphasize Eric's need to sit with Jigsaw to rescue his son; Tobin Bell agreed with most of these changes, which Wahlberg added after finishing shooting every day, and the two improsived together on set. Hoffman said in an interview with Fangoria that they listened to fans' suggestions. For instance, instead of only showing the aftermath of a character violently dying in a flashback, they would allow it to unfold as it happened. This was in contrast to Saw, in which most of the violence was implied off-screen.

Casting 
From the first film, Tobin Bell returned to play Jigsaw even though he wasn't obligated to return. Bell found it fascinating to reprise his role, but played the role like any of his, feeling that he needed to put himself on Jigsaw's side to get into character and play him properly. Shawnee Smith similarly returned to play Amanda even though she never imagined ever reprising the role as she didn't expect the first film to be such a hit. Smith was paid $150,000 for her role with an additional $100,000 if the film grossed over $50 million.  Bousman served as a stand-in for the hooded figure who places a key behind Michael Marks' eye, who the fans immediately theorized to be the first film's protagonist Dr. Lawrence Gordon, to add "flavor" to the performance, though Bousman didn't intend the figure to be Gordon.

Donnie Wahlberg was cast as Eric Matthews out of attraction to the character and the script. At sixteen years old, Erik Knudsen was cast as Daniel Matthews in his first major feature film appearance; Knudsen auditioned hard to get the role and was excited upon being notified that he had won the part, as the first Saw was one of his favorite horror films along with the Scream series.

Beverley Mitchell was cast as Laura Hunter despite her dislike for horror films and her inability to watch the first film full until trying for the fifth time, but she accepted the role nonetheless because she was looking for a challenging and frightening part to push her limits, which she found in Laura physically due to the requirement to play sick and coughing. Lyriq Bent originally auditioned for the role of Xavier Chavez, but was cast as Daniel Rigg instead out of fear for racial stereotypes of casting an African-American as a drug dealer, leading to Franky G's casting as Xavier, though Bent still found stereotypical of making the character Puerto-Rican.

Filming and post-production
Saw II was given a larger production budget of $4 million, compared to Saws budget of a little over $1 million. The marketing budget was an additional $2 million. The film was initially given 21 days to be shot. The nerve gas house scenes were shot in an abandoned warehouse in Toronto and the actors who played the Jigsaw victims there worked sixteen hours each day. At the time of filming, in addition to having an on-set tutor for two hours, Erik Knudsen caught the flu, so he filmed his part while sick, which he mused that actually worked due to his character's apparent poisoning throughout the film. The ending was filmed on May 25 and 26. Visual effects were performed by C.O.R.E. Digital Pictures and post-production services were provided by Deluxe.

Trap designs
David Hackl, the film's production designer, took three weeks to construct 27 sets on a single sound stage. The puppet Billy, used in the series to give instructions to Jigsaw's victims, was originally created by Wan out of paper towel rolls and papier-mâché. Given the larger budget for the sequel, Billy was upgraded with remote-controlled eyes and a servo-driven mouth. In one trap, "The Needle Room", Smith's character Amanda is thrown into a pit of needles to find a key. In order for this to be done safely, four people, over a period of four days, removed the needle tips from syringes and replaced them with fiber optic tips. They modified a total of 120,000 fake needles. However, this number was insufficient, and the pit had to be filled with styrofoam and other materials to make it appear to have more needles. The needles that were apparently stuck into Smith were actually blunted syringes stuck into padding under her clothing. For certain shots, a fake arm was used.

Bousman came up with an idea whereby a character's hands would get stuck in some sort of vessel, and this resulted in the "Hand Trap". It proved to be a challenge, but after much discussion, Hackl, property master Jim Murray and art director Michele Brady came up with a suitable design. They arranged a glass box suspended by chains from the ceiling which contained a hypodermic needle with the antidote and which had two hand-holes on the underside. As soon as Emmanuelle Vaugier's character Addison puts her hands into the holes, razor blades would close in on her hands, and any attempt to withdraw from the trap would cause her to bleed to death. In order for the trap to be used safely, the prop builders made the handcuffs move inside the box and fake blades that would retract from the actress's hands, thus allowing her to slide her hands out. Hackl subsequently commented that the character did not have to put her hands into the trap, as there was a lock with a key on the other side of the box that would have opened the contraption.

The original idea for the "Furnace Trap" came from the house having been a crematorium at some point, but this would have involved turning the house into a funeral parlor, so it was instead decided that the furnace would be part of the house's boiler system. The furnace was visualized in the form of a computer model so that Bousman could better understand how shots could be filmed. Using the computer model as a guide, the furnace was constructed in three days using cement board and tin with removable sides and top so Timothy Burd's character Obi could be filmed crawling inside. The furnace produced real flames and, in place of Burd, a stuntman using a fire retardant gel crawled into the fire.

Release
The original teaser poster showing two bloody, severed fingers, representing the Roman numeral, II, was rejected by the Motion Picture Association of America. Since the poster was already released and managed to "slip by" the MPAA, they issued a release stating the poster was not approved and was unacceptable; Lionsgate removed the poster from their websites. The image was used instead for the film's soundtrack cover. Lionsgate held the second annual "Give Til It Hurts" blood drive for the Red Cross and collected 10,154 pints of blood.

Soundtrack
The Saw II soundtrack was released on October 25, 2005 by Treadstone Records. Johnny Loftus from AllMusic gave the soundtrack two and a half out of five stars, writing, "The remixer and occasional NIN member's music was overdone, mysterious, tense, and capably chilling, just like the horror-camp of the film itself." The video for "Forget to Remember" was also directed by Bousman.

Home media
Saw II was released on DVD, VHS, and Universal Media Disc on February 14, 2006, through Lions Gate Home Entertainment.  The DVD debuted as number one selling 2.5 million units in its first day. It went on to sell 3.9 million units its first week, becoming the fastest selling theatrical DVD in Lions Gate's history. In rentals, Saw II topped the charts its first week bringing in $9.96 million in combined rentals, pushing Just Like Heaven ($5.96 million) to number 2. Its second week, it placed first on rental charts with $5.29 million despite a 47% drop from its first week.

On October 24, 2006, a DVD "Unrated Special Edition" was released, while an Unrated Blu-ray edition was also released with various special features on January 23, 2007.

Reception

Box office
Saw II opened with $31.7 million on 3,879 screens across 2,949 theaters. The three-day Halloween opening weekend set a Lionsgate record. It became at the time, the widest release for the distubtor and one of the best opening weekends for a horror sequel. For its second weekend it fell 47% making $16.9 million.

Saw II opened in the United Kingdom with $3.8 million on 305 screens, 70% larger than the first instalment. It opened in Japan on 67 screens with $750,000. Opening to $1.3 million on 173 screens it was the number one film in Australia. The film grossed $87 million in the United States and Canada and $60.7 million in other markets for a worldwide total of $147.7 million. In the United States and Canada, Saw II is the highest-grossing film of the Saw series.

Critical response 
  Audiences polled by CinemaScore gave the film an average grade of "B+" on an A+ to F scale.

Robert Koehler of Variety wrote, "cooking up new Rube Goldberg torture contraptions isn't enough to get Saw II out of the shadow of its unnerving predecessor". Gregory Kirschling of Entertainment Weekly gave the film a B minus, saying "Saw II is just barely a better B flick than Saw" and that both films are "more clever and revolting than they are actually chilling". He praised Bell's performance as Jigsaw, saying "As the droopy-lidded maniac in the flesh, Tobin Bell is, for all the film's gewgaws, Saw II sturdiest horror, a Terence Stamp look-alike who calls to mind a seedy General Zod lazily overseeing the universe from his evildoer's lair". He ended his review: "Where Saw II lags behind in Saw's novelty, it takes the lead with its smoother landing, which is again primed to blow the movie wide open, but manages a more compelling job of it than the original's cheat finish".

Kevin Crust of the Los Angeles Times called Saw II a "worthy follow-up to its grisly predecessor". He said the story was "much more focused on an endgame than the original film. There are fewer credibility gaps and there are plenty of reversals to satisfy fans". He criticized the use of numerous flashbacks, saying that it "rob[s] us of the pleasure of actually remembering for ourselves". Laura Kern, writing for The New York Times, said that Bousman "delivers similar hard-core, practically humorless frights and hair-raising tension, but only after getting past a shaky beginning that plays more like a forensics-themed television show than a scary movie" and called Greutert's editing "crafty". She called the sequel "more trick than treat" and that it "doesn't really compare to its fine predecessor - though it still manages to be eye-opening (and sometimes positively nauseating) in itself". Empires Kim Newman gave the film three out of five stars. He said that the film improves upon Saw "perverse fascination with Seven-style murders and brutally violent puzzles" and that Jigsaw's intellectual games make "Hannibal Lecter look like the compiler of The Suns quick crossword". He ended his reviews saying, "Morally dubious it may be, but this gory melange of torture, terror and darkly humorous depravity appeals to the sick puppy within us all".

Accolades
Tobin Bell was nominated for "Best Villain" at the 2006 MTV Movie Awards for his role as Jigsaw, though the award went to Hayden Christensen for his role as Darth Vader in Star Wars: Episode III – Revenge of the Sith.

Notes

References

External links

 
 
 
 
 

2
Crime horror films
2005 horror films
2005 films
2000s psychological horror films
American sequel films
2005 directorial debut films
2000s English-language films
Films about cancer
Films scored by Charlie Clouser
Films directed by Darren Lynn Bousman
Films with screenplays by Leigh Whannell
Films shot in Toronto
Rating controversies in film
Advertising and marketing controversies in film
Obscenity controversies in film
Lionsgate films
American splatter films
Canadian splatter films
Torture in films
2000s American films